Efjord Chapel is a chapel of the Church of Norway in Narvik Municipality in Nordland county, Norway. It is located in the village of Kobbvika. It is an annex chapel in the Ballangen parish which is part of the Ofoten prosti (deanery) in the Diocese of Sør-Hålogaland. The white, wooden chapel was built in a long church style in 1985 using plans drawn up by the architect Elund Leiros. The chapel seats about 75 people. The chapel holds at least six worship services each year.

See also
List of churches in Sør-Hålogaland

References

Narvik
Churches in Nordland
Wooden churches in Norway
20th-century Church of Norway church buildings
Churches completed in 1985
1985 establishments in Norway
Long churches in Norway